Horacio Enrique Accavallo (14 October 1934 – 14 September 2022) was an Argentine professional boxer who competed from 1956 until 1967. He held the undisputed WBA and WBC flyweight titles between March 1966 to October 1968.

Professional career

Accavallo fought mainly in Argentina. On 1 March 1966, he won the vacant WBA & WBC world flyweight championship by outpointing Katsuyoshi Takayama on 15-round split decision in Tokyo, Japan.
Accavallo had been the second contender for the world flyweight title held by Salvatore Burruni. The WBA & WBC had mandated that Burruni fight Hiroyuki Ebihara (the first contender). But Burruni chose to defend the title against Rocky Gattellari. The WBA & WBC stripped the champion of his crown and sanctioned the Accavallo - Katsuyoshi Takayama (the third contender) match for the title.
Accavallo retired as the reigning WBA & WBC champion after escaping with a controversial 15 round majority decision victory over former world flyweight champion Hiroyuki Ebihara.

Professional boxing record

∂ƒ

See also 
List of flyweight boxing champions

References

External links

|-

|-

|-

|-

1934 births
2022 deaths
Flyweight boxers
World flyweight boxing champions
World Boxing Association champions
World Boxing Council champions
Sportspeople from Buenos Aires Province
Argentine male boxers
Burials at La Chacarita Cemetery